Brian Willis Gutekunst (born July 19, 1973) is an American football executive who is the general manager for the Green Bay Packers of the National Football League (NFL). He joined the team in 1998 and served as a scout and assistant executive before being promoted to general manager in 2018.

Biography
Gutekunst was born on July 19, 1973, in Raleigh, North Carolina. His father, John Gutekunst, was the head coach of the Minnesota Golden Gophers football team. Gutekunst attended the University of Wisconsin–La Crosse. During his time there, he played defensive back on the football team before suffering a career-ending shoulder injury. Afterwards, he served as an assistant coach with the team, including during their 1995 Division III National Championship season.

Scouting career
Gutekunst spent most of the 1998 NFL season with the Kansas City Chiefs as a scouting assistant. He then joined the Packers as a college scout for the East Coast of the United States. Gutekunst assumed his position as director of college scouting in 2012. He was promoted to director of player personnel in March 2016. In January 2018, Packers general manager Ted Thompson, who had been recently diagnosed with a neurodegenerative disorder, assumed a reduced role and named Gutekunst to the position after interviewing other internal candidates.

References

External links
Green Bay Packers bio

1973 births
Green Bay Packers general managers
Living people
Sportspeople from Raleigh, North Carolina
Wisconsin–La Crosse Eagles football coaches
Wisconsin–La Crosse Eagles football players
Green Bay Packers scouts
Green Bay Packers executives
Kansas City Chiefs scouts
Players of American football from North Carolina
National Football League general managers